Christian Gilberto Ovelar Rodríguez (born 18 January 1985) is a Paraguayan footballer who plays for Deportivo Capiatá.

References
 
 
 

1985 births
Living people
Paraguayan footballers
Paraguayan expatriate footballers
Paraguay international footballers
Sportspeople from Ciudad del Este
Cerro Porteño (Presidente Franco) footballers
Club Sol de América footballers
C.D. Jorge Wilstermann players
Santiago Morning footballers
Sportivo Luqueño players
Olaria Atlético Clube players
Club Olimpia footballers
Millonarios F.C. players
Paraguayan Primera División players
Categoría Primera A players
Expatriate footballers in Chile
Expatriate footballers in Bolivia
Expatriate footballers in Brazil
Paraguayan expatriate sportspeople in Chile
Paraguayan expatriate sportspeople in Bolivia
Paraguayan expatriate sportspeople in Brazil
Association football forwards